The 2014 NHK Trophy was the final event of six in the 2014–15 ISU Grand Prix of Figure Skating, a senior-level international invitational competition series. It was held at the Namihaya Dome in Osaka on November 28–30. Medals were awarded in the disciplines of men's singles, ladies' singles, pair skating, and ice dancing. Skaters earned points toward qualifying for the 2014–15 Grand Prix Final.

Entries
The entries were as follows:

Changes to preliminary assignments
 On July 10, Felicia Zhang and Nathan Bartholomay were removed from the roster. On July 15, it was announced that Mari Vartmann / Aaron van Cleave had been named as replacements. On July 16, it was revealed that Zhang/Bartholomay had split up.
 On August 12, Daisuke Murakami, Riona Kato, and Emi Hirai / Marien de la Asuncion were added as host picks.
 On September 29, Julia Antipova / Nodari Maisuradze were removed from the roster, due to Antipova being hospitalized due to anorexia. On October 8, Arina Cherniavskaia / Antonio Souza-Kordeyru were announced as their replacements.
 On October 9, Guan Jinlin was removed from the roster. No reason has been given. On October 23, Jeremy Ten was announced as his replacement.
 On October 14, Nikol Gosviani was removed from the roster. No reason has been given. On October 30, Elene Gedevanishvili was announced as he replacement.
 On October 27, Kevin Reynolds withdrew due to an injury. On October 30, Jorik Hendrickx was announced as his replacement.
 On October 29, it was reported by the German Skating Union that Peter Liebers was withdrawing. He was officially removed on October 30. On November 11, Elladj Balde was announced as his replacement.
 On November 9, it was reported that Adelina Sotnikova withdrew due to a torn ankle ligament. She was officially removed from the roster on November 11. On November 17, Anne Line Gjersem was announced as her replacement.
 On November 24, Jorik Hendrickx and Arina Cherniavskaia / Antonio Souza-Kordeyru were removed from the roster. No replacements have been announced.

Results

Men

Ladies

Pairs

Ice dancing

References

External links
 2014 NHK Trophy at the International Skating Union
 Starting orders and result details

NHK Trophy, 2014
NHK Trophy